Estonian Curling Association (abbreviation ECA) is one of the sport governing bodies in Estonia which deals with curling. It was established in 2002. The president of ECA is Rainer Vakra.

ECA is a member of World Curling Federation and Estonian Olympic Committee.

References

External links
 

Curling governing bodies
Sports governing bodies in Estonia
Curling in Estonia
Sports organizations established in 2002